Rowes Bay is a suburb of Townsville in the City of Townsville, Queensland, Australia.

Geography
Rowes Bay is located in a low-lying area adjacent to the Cleveland Bay beach. Its borders are determined by the Coral Sea, Townsville Airport and Mundy Creek, and only a small portion of the suburb's area is taken up by housing. Neighbouring suburbs include Garbutt, West End and Belgian Gardens; however, Rowes Bay is relatively isolated from other suburbs due to its location surrounded by the Town Common. 

The Townsville Cemetery (also known as Belgian Gardens Cemetery) and a retirement village are located within the suburb.

History
Rowes Bay was named after Charles Seville Rowe, one of the first settlers at Cleveland Bay. Only after World War II did the name Rowes come into general use; prior to this the area was recorded as Rose Bay and Ross Bay.

During World War II, Jimmys Lookout had an anti-aircraft gun and search light battery. Its purpose was to protect Townsville and in particular the military airport from Japanese airborne attacks.

The Queensland Police Service Academy (North Queensland campus) commenced training in October 1996.

Education 
Cleveland Education and Training Centre is a primary and secondary (5-12) special-purpose school for boys and girls in  the Cleveland Youth Detention Centre on Old Common Road. In 2018, the school had an enrolment of 66 students with 24 teachers (21 full-time equivalent) and 17 non-teaching staff (13 full-time equivalent).

There are no mainstream schools in Rowes Bay. The nearest government primary school is Belgian Gardens State School in neighbouring Belgian Gardens to the south-east. The nearest government secondary school is Townsville State High School in Railway Estate to the south-east.

Facilities 
Cleveland Youth Detention Centre is for young people aged between 10 and 17 years who have been sentenced to detention or are being held on remand by the courts. It is on Old Comons Road.

Despite the name, Belgian Gardens Cemetery is within Rowes Bay at 62 Evans Street, but access to the cemetery is via the suburb of Belgian Gardens. It is managed by the Townsville City Council.

The Townsville War Cemetery is within the Belgian Gardens cemetery. It has 222 burials from World War II. The Office of Australian War Graves is within the cemetery. The war cemetery is managed by the Commonwealth War Graves Commission.

Amenities 
Rowes Bay Retirement Community is a retirement village at Havana Street off Cape Pallandera Road.

There are a number of parks in the suburb, including:

 Hooper Street Park
 Rowes Bay Park

Attractions
Rowes Bay is dominated by a scenic  Cleveland Bay beach, which has sweeping views of Magnetic Island.  The beach is punctuated at intervals by tidal creeks. A short drive up Cape Pallarenda Road is located the suburb of Pallarenda which is equipped with a beachfront park and boat ramp. Cycling or jogging alone the sealed foreshore pathway is a popular pastime but swimming is not encouraged due to a risk of crocodile or jellyfish attack.

At the southern end of the beach area is Soroptimist Park, which has lawns, barbecue facilities and an adventure playground designed specifically to be suitable for all children including those with disabilities. The park includes several attractive pieces of public art, contributed in 1988 and 1994. The northern end of the beach is a popular site for kitesurfing.

Jimmys Lookout is off Old Commons Road on the western edge of the Belgian Gardens Cemetery.

Gallery

References

Suburbs of Townsville
Bays of Queensland